In Greek mythology, Orithyia or Oreithyia (/ɒrɪˈθaɪ.ə/; Ancient Greek: Ὠρείθυια Ōreithuia; Latin: Ōrīthyia) was an Athenian princess who was raped by Boreas, the north wind, and gave birth to the twin Boreads, Zetes and Calaïs.

Family 
Orithyia was the fifth daughter of King Erechtheus of Athens and his wife, Praxithea, daughter of Phrasimus and Diogeneia. She was sister to Cecrops, Pandorus, Metion, Protogeneia, Pandora, Procris, Creusa, and Chthonia. Her other possible siblings were Merope, Orneus, Thespius, Eupalamus and Sicyon.

Orithyia gave Boreas two daughters, Chione and Cleopatra (the wife of Phineus) and two sons, Calais and Zetes, both known as the Boreads. These sons grew wings like their father and joined the Argonauts in the quest for the golden fleece.

Legends 

Boreas, the north wind, fell in love with Orithyia. At first he attempted to woo her, but after failing at that he decided to take her by force, as violence felt more natural to him. While she was playing by the Ilissos River, Orithyia was carried off to Sarpedon's Rock, near the Erginos River in Thrace.  There she was wrapped in a cloud and attacked. Aeschylus wrote a satyr play about the abduction called Orithyia which has been lost.

Plato wrote somewhat mockingly that there may have been a rational explanation for her story. She may have been killed on the rocks of the river when a gust of northern wind came, and so she was said to have been 'taken by Boreas'.  He also mentioned in another account that she was taken by Boreas not along the Ilissos, but from the Areopagus, a rock outcropping near the Acropolis where murderers were tried. However, many scholars regard this as a later gloss.

Plato also recounted that Orithyia was playing with a companion nymph Pharmacea.

Because she was in Thrace with Boreas, she did not die when her sisters who either committed suicide or were sacrificed so that Athens could win a war against Eleusis.

Orithyia was later made into the goddess of cold mountain winds. It is said that prior to the destruction of a large number of barbarian ships due to weather during the Persian War, the Athenians offered sacrifices to Boreas and Oreithyia, praying for their assistance.

In art 

 Boreas Abducting Orithyia (1640), red chalk drawing by Giovanni Maria Morandi, currently at the Museum Kunstpalast, Düsseldorf.
 The Abduction of Orithyia (18th century), painting by Francesco Solimena, currently at the National Art Museum of Azerbaijan, Baku.
 The Abduction of Orithyia (about 1730), painting in the style of Francesco Solimena, currently at the Walters Art Museum, Baltimore.
 The Rape of Orithyia by Boreas (1702), bronze sculpture by Giovanni Battista Foggini, currently at the Art Gallery of Ontario, Toronto.
 The Rape of Orithyia by Boreas (about 1745), porcelain from Doccia manufactory after Giovanni Battista Foggini, currently at the Art Institute of Chicago.
  Boreas Abducting Orithyia" (1614), Oil on Wood, by Peter Paul Rubens, currently at the Akademie der bildenden Künste , Vienna.
https://www.wga.hu/frames-e.html?/html/r/rubens/21mythol/index.html

Gallery

Notes

References 

 Aken, Dr. A.R.A. van. (1961). Elseviers Mythologische Encyclopedie. Amsterdam: Elsevier.
 Apollodorus, The Library with an English Translation by Sir James George Frazer, F.B.A., F.R.S. in 2 Volumes, Cambridge, MA, Harvard University Press; London, William Heinemann Ltd. 1921. ISBN 0-674-99135-4. Online version at the Perseus Digital Library. Greek text available from the same website.
 Apollonius Rhodius, Argonautica translated by Robert Cooper Seaton (1853-1915), R. C. Loeb Classical Library Volume 001. London, William Heinemann Ltd, 1912. Online version at the Topos Text Project.
 Apollonius Rhodius, Argonautica. George W. Mooney. London. Longmans, Green. 1912. Greek text available at the Perseus Digital Library.
 Diodorus Siculus, The Library of History translated by Charles Henry Oldfather. Twelve volumes. Loeb Classical Library. Cambridge, Massachusetts: Harvard University Press; London: William Heinemann, Ltd. 1989. Vol. 3. Books 4.59–8. Online version at Bill Thayer's Web Site
 Diodorus Siculus, Bibliotheca Historica. Vol 1-2. Immanel Bekker. Ludwig Dindorf. Friedrich Vogel. in aedibus B. G. Teubneri. Leipzig. 1888-1890. Greek text available at the Perseus Digital Library.
Herodotus, The Histories with an English translation by A. D. Godley. Cambridge. Harvard University Press. 1920. . Online version at the Topos Text Project. Greek text available at Perseus Digital Library.
 Lucius Mestrius Plutarchus, Lives with an English Translation by Bernadotte Perrin. Cambridge, MA. Harvard University Press. London. William Heinemann Ltd. 1914. 1. Online version at the Perseus Digital Library. Greek text available from the same website.
 Pausanias, Description of Greece with an English Translation by W.H.S. Jones, Litt.D., and H.A. Ormerod, M.A., in 4 Volumes. Cambridge, MA, Harvard University Press; London, William Heinemann Ltd. 1918. . Online version at the Perseus Digital Library
 Pausanias, Graeciae Descriptio. 3 vols. Leipzig, Teubner. 1903.  Greek text available at the Perseus Digital Library.
 Publius Ovidius Naso, Metamorphoses translated by Brookes More (1859-1942). Boston, Cornhill Publishing Co. 1922. Online version at the Perseus Digital Library.
 Publius Ovidius Naso, Metamorphoses. Hugo Magnus. Gotha (Germany). Friedr. Andr. Perthes. 1892. Latin text available at the Perseus Digital Library.
Pindar, Pindar, Odes translated by Diane Arnson Svarlien. 1990. Online version at the Perseus Digital Library.
 Pindar, The Odes of Pindar including the Principal Fragments with an Introduction and an English Translation by Sir John Sandys, Litt.D., FBA. Cambridge, MA., Harvard University Press; London, William Heinemann Ltd. 1937. Greek text available at the Perseus Digital Library.
 Stephanus of Byzantium, Stephani Byzantii Ethnicorum quae supersunt, edited by August Meineike (1790-1870), published 1849. A few entries from this important ancient handbook of place names have been translated by Brady Kiesling. Online version at the Topos Text Project.
 Suida, Suda Encyclopedia translated by Ross Scaife, David Whitehead, William Hutton, Catharine Roth, Jennifer Benedict, Gregory Hays, Malcolm Heath Sean M. Redmond, Nicholas Fincher, Patrick Rourke, Elizabeth Vandiver, Raphael Finkel, Frederick Williams, Carl Widstrand, Robert Dyer, Joseph L. Rife, Oliver Phillips and many others. Online version at the Topos Text Project.

External links 

 Warburg Institute Iconographic Database (ca 35 images of Orithyia)

Princesses in Greek mythology
Mortal parents of demigods in classical mythology
Attican characters in Greek mythology